Aghancrossy is a townland in County Antrim, Northern Ireland, near Dervock. It is situated in the historic barony of Dunluce Lower and the civil parish of Derrykeighan and covers an area of 55 acres

The name derives from the Irish: Achadh na Croise (field of the cross). The population of the townland decreased during the 19th century:

See also
List of townlands in County Antrim

References

Townlands of County Antrim
Civil parish of Derrykeighan